Surf Crazy is a 1959 film directed by Bruce Brown. His second surf film, it follows surfers to Mexico, Hawaii and California.  Among the locations filmed was Velzyland in Hawaii, named for Brown's employer, surfboard manufacturer Dale Velzy.

References

External links
IMDb

1959 films
1959 documentary films
Films directed by Bruce Brown
Documentary films about surfing
American surfing films
Surfing in California
Surfing in Hawaii
Films set in California
Films set in Hawaii
Films set in Mexico
Films shot in California
Films shot in Hawaii
Films shot in Mexico
1950s English-language films
1950s American films